Amos P. Godby High School is a public high school in Tallahassee, Florida, named for Amos P. Godby, who first served as a teacher and coach at Leon High School, and later became Leon County Superintendent and President and Secretary of the Florida Superintendents Association.

History

Amos P. Godby High School opened in 1966 at 1717 West Tharpe Street, Tallahassee, Florida, 32303.

Its first senior class graduated in 1970.

Principals
1966 - 1968: O. D. Roberts
1968 - 1970: Stan Hilaman
1970 - 1973: Paul Coley
1973 - 1977: John E. Lawrence
1977 - 1989: William J. Montford
1989 - 1999: Merry (McDaris) Ortega
1999 - 2001: Ben Koenig
2001 - 2006: Randy Pridgeon
2007 - 2011: Jean Ferguson
2011 - 2012: Gillian Gregory
2012 - 2017: Shelly Bell
2017–Present: Desmond Cole

Athletics
Godby High School's mascot is the Cougar, and their colors are royal blue and white.

Sports offerings at the school include:

 Fall sports: cross country, football, boys' and girls' golf, and volleyball
 Winter sports: boys' and girls' basketball, boys' and girls' soccer, wrestling, and girls' weightlifting
 Spring sports: baseball, flag football, softball, tennis, boys' (current state champions) and girls' track, and weightlifting
1976 Class 4A State Champions in football
1986 Class 3A State Champions in football
1987 Class 4A State Champions in football
2001 Class 4A State Champions in baseball
2012 Class 5A State Champions in football

Notable alumni
 Butch Benton, former MLB player 
 Mackey Sasser, former MLB player 
 John Wasdin,  former MLB player
 Charles Wilson, former NFL player
 Travis Fisher, former NFL player, Nebraska Assistant Coach
 Buck Gurley, former NFL player
 Chad Plummer, former NFL player
 John Henry Mills, former NFL player
 Jenny Worth, IFBB fitness & figure competitor

See also

Old Lincoln High School

References

External links

Amos P. Godby High School

Leon County School Board

Schools in Tallahassee, Florida
High schools in Leon County, Florida
Public high schools in Florida
1966 establishments in Florida
Educational institutions established in 1966